The Gran Premio San Giuseppe is a one-day cycling race held annually in Italy. It was part of UCI Europe Tour in category 1.2 from 2005 to 2013, when it was reserved for amateurs in 2014.

Winners

References

Cycle races in Italy
UCI Europe Tour races
Recurring sporting events established in 1985
1985 establishments in Italy